Hubert Zenon Skrzypczak (born 29 September 1943 in Wejherowo) is a boxer from  Poland. He competed for Poland in the 1968 Summer Olympics held in Mexico City, Mexico in the light flyweight event where he finished in third place. His height is 5 foot 11.

References

1943 births
Olympic boxers of Poland
Olympic bronze medalists for Poland
Boxers at the 1968 Summer Olympics
Living people
Olympic medalists in boxing
People from Wejherowo
Sportspeople from Pomeranian Voivodeship
Polish male boxers
Medalists at the 1968 Summer Olympics
Flyweight boxers